Paul Kozachuk (born May 12, 1994) is a professional Canadian football linebacker for the Montreal Alouettes of the Canadian Football League (CFL). He played U Sports football for the Toronto Varsity Blues from 2014 to 2017.

Professional career

Montreal Alouettes
Kozachuk was drafted by the Montreal Alouettes in the sixth round, 46th overall, in the 2018 CFL Draft and signed with the club on May 19, 2018. He made his professional debut on June 16, 2018 against the BC Lions. For the 2018 season, he played in 13 regular season games, recording nine special teams tackles. In 2019, he played in 17 regular season games, where he had one defensive tackle and eight special teams tackles. He made his post-season debut in the team's East Semi-Final loss to the Edmonton Eskimos where he had one special teams tackle.

Toronto Argonauts
After becoming a free agent, Kozachuk signed with the Toronto Argonauts on February 18, 2020. However, he did not play in 2020 due to the cancellation of the 2020 CFL season and was re-signed on February 17, 2021. He was later released on May 18, 2021.

Montreal Alouettes (II)
On September 14, 2021, it was announced that Kozachuk had re-signed with the Montreal Alouettes to a practice roster agreement.

References

External links
Montreal Alouettes bio 

1994 births
Living people
Montreal Alouettes players
Toronto Argonauts players
Toronto Varsity Blues football players
Canadian football linebackers
Players of Canadian football from Ontario
Sportspeople from London, Ontario